Johann Wilde was an 18th-century German violinist and musical instrument inventor. He is best known for inventing the nail violin in 1740. He is also credited with the introduction of the Chinese sheng mouth organ to the Court of St. Petersburg, Russia.

References

External links
"Nail Violin" Encyclopædia Britannica
Diagnostic Features of Early and Later Wheatstone Concertinas 
Portable Music

Year of birth missing
Year of death missing
German violinists
German male violinists
18th-century German inventors
Russian inventors